= Heli Everest =

Helicopter operator in Nepal

Heli Everest Pvt. Ltd.
- Founded: 2016
- Commenced operations: 9 December 2016
- Hubs: Tribhuvan International Airport
- Fleet size: 4
- Headquarters: Kathmandu, Nepal
- Website: www.helieverest.com

Heli Everest Pvt. Ltd. is a Nepalese helicopter charter operator headquartered in Kathmandu, Nepal. The company commenced commercial operations on 9 December 2016 after receiving an Air Operator Certificate (AOC) from the Civil Aviation Authority of Nepal (CAAN). It provides helicopter charter, mountain rescue, pilgrimage, aerial sightseeing, cargo transportation, and utility helicopter services throughout Nepal.

== History ==
Heli Everest Pvt. Ltd. commenced commercial helicopter operations on 9 December 2016. The airline was established by a group of Nepalese entrepreneurs with experience in tourism and aviation. According to Aviation Nepal, the company began operations with two Airbus AS350 B3e (H125) helicopters registered as 9N-AKG and 9N-AKP.

The Civil Aviation Authority of Nepal subsequently listed Heli Everest as a licensed domestic helicopter operator under Air Operator Certificate (AOC) No. 086/2016. CAAN records identify Kathmandu as the company's principal operating base.

== Operations ==
Heli Everest operates domestic helicopter charter services across Nepal. The company provides emergency medical evacuation (HEMS), search and rescue missions, high-altitude logistics support, aerial surveys, cargo transport, religious pilgrimage flights, tourism charters, and mountain sightseeing flights.

The airline primarily serves remote mountain regions where helicopter transportation is required for rescue, expedition support, humanitarian assistance, and tourism operations.

== Fleet ==
According to the company, Heli Everest currently operates Airbus H125 (AS350 B3e) helicopters.

Historical CAAN records identify the following aircraft in the company's fleet:

Aircraft	Registration	Status
Airbus AS350 B3e	9N-AKG	Active at commencement
Airbus AS350 B3e	9N-AKP	Active at commencement

== Incidents and accidents ==
On 9 April 2023, a Heli Everest Airbus AS350 B3e helicopter operating a flight between the Italian Base Camp and Dhaulagiri Base Camp was reported missing. Search and rescue teams later located the helicopter near Dhaulagiri Base Camp after it had crashed. The pilot, who was the sole occupant, survived the accident without serious injuries. No fatalities were reported.
